is a city located in Saitama Prefecture, Japan. , the city had an estimated population of 117,995 in 50,801 households and a population density of 1700 persons per km².

Geography
Located in east-central Saitama Prefecture, Kōnosu is on the central reaches of the Arakawa River, which flows through the west of the city, whereas the Motoara River flows from the southeastern to central portion.

Surrounding municipalities
Saitama Prefecture

Kitamoto
Okegawa
Kumagaya
Gyōda
Yoshimi
Kazo
Kuki

Climate
Kōnosu has a humid subtropical climate (Köppen Cfa) characterized by warm summers and cool winters with light to no snowfall.  The average annual temperature in Kōnosu is 14.6 °C. The average annual rainfall is 1335 mm with September as the wettest month. The temperatures are highest on average in August, at around 26.6 °C, and lowest in January, at around 3.6 °C.

Demographics
Per Japanese census data, the population of Kōnosu has recently plateaued after a long period of growth.

History
In ancient times, the area around Kōnosu was the center of Musashi Province and there are many kofun burial mounds. The area was a favored falconry site by the Tokugawa shoguns during the Edo period and was also the location of Kōnosu-shuku, a post station on the Nakasendō highway.

The town of Kōnosu was created within Kitaadachi District, Saitama with the establishment of the modern municipalities system on April 1, 1889.  On July 1, 1954, Kōnosu annexed the neighboring villages of Mida, Tamamiya, Mamuro and Kasahara (from Kitasaitama District). On September 30, 1954 Kōnosu annexed the village of Jōkō, and was elevated to city status. On October 1, 2005 the villages of Kawasato and Fukiage were also annexed.

Government
Kōnosu has a mayor-council form of government with a directly elected mayor and a unicameral city council of 26 members. Kōnosu contributes two members to the Saitama Prefectural Assembly. In terms of national politics, the city is divided between the Saitama 6th district and Saitama 12th district of the lower house of the Diet of Japan.

Economy
Plastics and electronic components manufacturing are the largest industries in Kōnosu. Flower gardening and rice cultivation are also popular, and Kōnosu is also the main production center for traditional dolls used in the Hinamatsuri festival. The city is also increasing becoming a commuter town for the Tokyo Metropolis.

Education
Kōnosu has 19 public elementary schools and eight public middle schools operated by the city government, and three public high schools operated by the Saitama Prefectural Board of Education. The prefecture also operates one special education school for the handicapped.

Previously the city housed a Brazilian school, Centro Educacional Canarinho.

Transportation

Railway
 JR East – Takasaki Line
 –   –

Highway

Local attractions

Kōnosu earned the nickname "Doll Town" for its many "Hina Ningyō" (a type of Japanese doll) factories. Kōnosu is also called "Flower town". It has several flower markets, and many flowers purchased in Tokyo and throughout the Kantō region are grown in Kōnosu.

Festivals
 Sakura Matsuri
 Natsu Matsuri (Summer Festival)
 Ootori Matsuri (autumn)
 Ojuya (November 13 to November 15)
 Shishimai (August 18)
 Mato Matsuri (January 12)

Twin towns — sister cities

Noted people from Kōnosu
Shōei, actor
Kazuyuki Nakane, Politician 
Chō, voice actor
Naomichi Marufuji, professional wrestler
Susumu Takagi, Politician
One (manga artist), Mangaká (brought up)

References

External links

Official Website 

Cities in Saitama Prefecture
Kōnosu